Panchala was an ancient kingdom of northern India, located in the Ganges-Yamuna Doab of the Upper Gangetic plain. During Late Vedic times (c. 1100–500 BCE), it was one of the most powerful states of ancient India, closely allied with the Kuru Kingdom. By the c. 5th century BCE, it had become an oligarchic confederacy, considered one of the solasa (sixteen) mahajanapadas (major states) of the Indian subcontinent. After being absorbed into the Mauryan Empire (322–185 BCE), Panchala regained its independence until it was annexed by the Gupta Empire in the 4th century CE.

Location
The Pañcāla state was located to the west of the Gomti river, and the north of the Chambal River. Its western neighbours were the Sūrasenas and the Yakṛllomas, while in the north-west it was separated from the Gaṅgā and the Kurus by dense forests. The northern boundaries of Pañcāla were the forests around the region of the Gaṅgā's source. The territory of Pañcāla corresponded to the modern-day Bareilly, Budaun, and Farrukhabad districts, as well as the nearby parts of Rohilkhand and of the Central Gaṅgā-Yamunā Doab in Uttar Pradesh.

In Mahabharata
Drupada, the king of Panchala was the father of Draupadi, the heroine of the epic, who married the Pandavas. To avenge her humiliation during the game of dice played at Hastinapur and which led to their lengthy exile, he fought on the side of the Pandavas at the Kurukshetra War. Bhishma ranked him a Mighty Maharathi, his son Dhrishtadyumna an Atirathi and his other son, Shikhandi, a Rathi. He contributed three (of the seven) Akshauhini armies to the Pandavas during the war.

Vedic period 
The Panchala janapada is believed to have been formed by multiple janas (tribes). The Shatapatha Brahmana suggests that Panchala was the later name of the Krivi tribe (who, according to the Rigveda, lived on the bank of the Indus river). The later Vedic literature uses the term Panchala to describe the close associates of the Kurus. The Mahabharata mentions the 'Saranjayas' as a tribe or a family among the Panchalas, occasionally using the terms inter-changeably, but also separately at a few places. The Mahabharata further mentions that the Panchala country was divided into two territories: the northern Panchala with its capital at Ahichchhatra, and the southern Panchala with its capital at Kampilya.

According to the political scientist Sudama Misra, the name of the Panchala janapada suggests that it was a fusion of five (pancha) janas (tribes). H.C. Raychaudhuri theorized that these five clans were the Krivis, the Turvashas, the Keshins, the Srinjayas, and the Somakas. Each of these clans is known to be associated with one or more princes mentioned in the Vedic texts - the Krivis with Kravya Panchala, the Turvashas with Sona Satrasaha, the Keshins with Keshin Dalbhya, the Srinjayas with Sahadeva Sarnjaya, and the Somakas with Somaka Sahadevya. The names of the last two clans, the Somakas and the Srinjayas, are also mentioned in the Mahabharata and the Puranas.

King Drupada, whose daughter Draupadi was married into the Pandavas in the Mahabharata, belonged to the Somaka clan. However, the Mahabharata and the Puranas consider the ruling clan of the northern Panchala as an offshoot of the Bharata clan, identifying Divodasa, Sudas, Srinjaya, Somaka, and Drupada (also called Yajnasena) as its most notable rulers. It is also mentioned that Sutasoma, the son of Draupadi and the Pandava prince Bhima, was the king of the Somaka tribe during the Kurukshetra War.

The Panchala kingdom rose to its highest prominence in the aftermath of the decline of the Kuru Kingdom, culminating in its eventual defeat by the non-Vedic Salva tribe. The king of Panchala, Keśin Dālbhya (approximately between 900 and 750 BCE), was the nephew of the Kuru king, who had died heirless; Keśin subsequently took over the leadership, establishing his kingdom as the new political and cultural center, and ensuring the continuation of the Vedic tradition. His dynasty remained in power for many generations; one of his later successors was the philosopher-king Pravahana Jaivali, who was the contemporary of King Janaka of Videha and the philosophers Uddalaka Aruni and Svetaketu (8th–7th centuries BCE).

Under Magadhan rule 
Originally a monarchical clan, the Panchalas appear to have switched to a republican model of government around 500 BCE. The Buddhist text Anguttara Nikaya mentions Panchala as one of the sixteen mahajanapadas of the c. 6th century BCE. The 4th century BCE text Arthashastra also attests the Panchalas as following the Rajashabdopajivin (king consul) constitution. Panchala was annexed into the Magadha empire during the reign of Mahapadma Nanda in the mid-4th century BCE.

Post-Mauryan period 
Numismatic evidence reveals the existence of independent rulers of Panchala during the post-Mauryan period. Most of the coins issued by them are found at Ahichatra and adjoining areas. All the coins are round, made of a copper alloy and have a set pattern on the obverse-a deeply incised square punch consisting of a row of three symbols and the ruler's name placed in a single line below them. The reverse bears depictions of the deities or sometimes of their attributes, whose names form a component of the issuers' names (for example, coins of Agnimitra bear the depiction of Agni). The names of the rulers found on these coins are Vangapala, Yajnapala, Damagupta, Rudragupta, Jayagupta, Suryamitra, Phalgunimitra, Bhanumitra, Bhumimitra, Dhruvamitra, Agnimitra, Indramitra, Vishnumitra, Jayamitra, Prajapatimitra, Varunamitra, Anamitra, Bhadraghosha and Yugasena (the reverse of the coins of Varunamitra, Yugasena and Anamitra do not exhibit any deity). Shaunakayaniputra Vangapala, ruler of Ahichatra, whom Vaidehiputra Ashadhasena mentioned as his grandfather in his Pabhosa inscription, is identified with king Vangapala, known from his coins. The name of Damagupta is also found on a clay sealing.

The last independent ruler of Ahichatra was Achyuta, who was defeated by Samudragupta, after which Panchala was annexed into the Gupta Empire. The coins of Achyuta found from Ahichatra have a wheel of eight spokes on the reverse and the legend Achyu on the obverse.

Rulers 

Ajamida II had a son named Rishin. Rishin had two sons namely Samvarana II whose son was Kuru and Brihadvasu whose descendants were Panchalas.

List of Panchala Kingdom rulers are-

 Rishin, (his sons were Brihadvasu and Samvarana II) 
 Brihadbhanu, (son of Brihadvasu)
 Brihatkaya
 Puranjaya
 Riksha
 Bramhyaswa
 Aramyaswa
 Mudgala, Yavinara, Pratiswan, Kampilya (Founder of Kampilya - Capital of Panchala Kingdom) and Sranjaya were the sons of Aramyaswa and were the founders of Panchala Kingdom and were called as Panchalas.
 Dritimana, (son of Mudgala)
 Drdhanemi
 Sarvasena, (founder of Ujjain Kingdom)
 Mitra
 Rukmaratha
 Suparswa
 Sumathi
 Sannatimana
 Krta
 Pijavana
 Somadutta
 Jantuvahana
 Badhrayaswa
 Brihadhishu
 Brihadhanu
 Brihadkarma
 Jayaratha 
 Visvajit
 Seinyajit
 Nepavirya, (after this King's name the country was named Nepaldesh)
 Samara
 Sadashva
 Ruchiraswa
 Pruthusena
 Prapti
 Prthaswa
 Sukrthi
 Vibhiraja
 Anuha
 Bramhadatta II
 Vishwaksena
 Dandasena
 Durmukha
 Durbuddhi
 Dharbhya
 Divodasa
 Sivana I
 Mitrayu
 Maitrayana
 Soma
 Sivana II
 Sadasana
 Sahadeva
 Somaka, (Somaka's eldest son was Sugandakrthu and youngest was Prishata. But in a war all sons died and Prishata Survived and became the king of Panchala)
 Prishati, (son of Somaka) 
 Drupada, (son of Prishata)
 Dhrishtadyumna, (was the son of Drupada, Draupadi and Shikhandi were the daughters of Drupada)
 Keśin Dālbhya
 Pravahana Jaivali
 Achyuta, (last known ruler of Panchala Kingdom which was defeated in  c. 350 CE by Gupta ruler Samudragupta.)

See also

 Vedic period
 Mahabharata
 History of India
 History of Hinduism
 Indus Valley civilization
 Painted Grey Ware culture
 Janapadas & Mahajanapadas
 Historicity of the Mahabharata
 Kuru Kingdom & Gandhara Kingdom

References

External links
Coins of Panchala janapada
Coins of Post-Mauryan Panchala Kingdom
Panchal Details from IGNCA

Kingdoms of the Puru clan
Ancient peoples
Indo-Aryan peoples
Iron Age cultures of Asia
Iron Age cultures of South Asia
Locations in Hindu mythology
Mahajanapadas
Archaeological cultures of South Asia
Archaeological cultures in India
Former kingdoms